Mountainous Landscape with a Torrent is an early 1670s landscape painting by the Dutch painter Jacob van Ruisdael. It is now in the Musée des Beaux-Arts of Strasbourg, France. Its inventory number is 619.

The painting was bought in 1911 in Berlin from Thomas Agnew & Sons by Wilhelm von Bode with a fund from the legacy of the publisher and patron of the museum, . The subject Ruisdael depicted – a dramatic landscape with "Nordic" (Scandinavian) elements and a castle on a hill, not found as such in the Low Countries – is inspired by works of Allaert van Everdingen, such as the imposing Nordic Landscape with a Castle on a Hill (also in the Musée des Beaux-Arts de Strasbourg).

References

Paintings in the collection of the Musée des Beaux-Arts de Strasbourg
1670s paintings
Paintings by Jacob van Ruisdael
Oil on canvas paintings